Sartaj Gill (sometimes spelled Sarrtaj Gill) is an Indian television actor best known for portraying Priyom Thakur In Begusarai.

Career

Gill started off career journey with the 2011 film Khap as Kush J. Mitter. He made his television debut in &TV's Begusarai playing Priyom Thakur in 2015.

From 2016 to 2017, he portrayed Raja/Raj/Kunwar Rajveer Singh on Zee TV's Ek Tha Raja Ek Thi Rani opposite Eisha Singh winning several awards.

In December 2018, he appeared in an episode of &TV's Laal Ishq playing Kishore Bagga opposite Neha Marda. Eight months later, Gill joined the cast of the same channel's comedy Gudiya Hamari Sabhi Pe Bhari as Muddhu Kandhele.

Filmography

References

External links 

 
 

Indian male soap opera actors
Living people
Year of birth missing (living people)